Rashaun is a given name. Notable people with the given name include:

Rashaun Allen (born 1990), American football player
Rashaun Broadus (born 1984), American basketball player
Rashaun Freeman (born 1984), American basketball player
Rashaun Woods (born 1980), American football player

See also
Rashan (given name)
Rashaan, given name
Rashawn, given name